The EDM Aerotec CoAX 2D/2R is a series of German coaxial main rotor helicopters designed and produced by EDM Aerotec of Geisleden. The aircraft is supplied complete and ready-to-fly.

Design and development
The CoAX 2D/2R was originally known as the FLIP 2 (Fly In Perfection) and is a derivative of the FLIP 1, a conventional helicopter with a main and tail rotor.

Design testing commenced in 2012. 

The design features dual coaxial main rotors, a two-seats-in side-by-side configuration enclosed cockpit and skid landing gear with ground handling wheels. The two variants use different power plants. 

The aircraft fuselage is made from composites.

Variants
CoAX 2D
Current production version in 2017, powered by a six-cylinder, liquid-cooled, four stroke  D-Motor LF39 engine.
CoAX 2R
Version powered by a four-cylinder, liquid and air-cooled, four stroke  Rotax 912ULS engine. No longer advertised as available in 2014.

Specifications (CoAX 2D)

See also
List of rotorcraft
Dynali H3 EasyFlyer
Guimbal Cabri G2
Heli-Sport CH77 Ranabot
IRI T250A
Konner K1
Robinson R22
Schweizer S300
Winner B150

References

External links

CoAX
2010s German sport aircraft
2010s German ultralight aircraft
2010s German civil utility aircraft
2010s German helicopters
Aircraft first flown in 2012
Coaxial rotor helicopters